Edmundo Hermosilla Hermosilla (born 13 July 1956) is a Chilean politician who served as minister of State under Eduardo Frei Ruíz-Tagle's government (1994–2000).

He was president of the retail company CMR Fallabella.

References

External links
 Profile at Annales de la República

1956 births
Living people
20th-century Chilean economists
21st-century Chilean economists
Christian Democratic Party (Chile) politicians
University of Chile alumni